Martin Plaehn is on the board of directors of SnapAV's parent company as of August 1, 2019 after the merger of Control4 and SnapAV. Prior to this date, he was the CEO and Chairman of the Board at Control4, a Salt Lake City, Utah based provider of home automation systems.

Plaehn was hired in 2011 and led Control4 through its IPO in August 2013, considered “the first pure-play home automation IPO ever.” Control4’s first day of trading set its overall valuation at about $400 million, compared to its initial valuation target of $225 million, and the company has posted “strong financials” since. In December 2013, Plaehn was named Control4’s Chairman of the Board. In 2015, the company won Best Home AV Control System Hardware at ISE 2015.

Plaehn has been interviewed about home automation on Bloomberg, CNBC, Silicon Valley Business Journal, and TheStreet.

Prior to Control4, Plaehn’s 30-year career in the electronic industry included roles as Senior VP of Product and Service Development at RealNetworks, EVP of Business and Product Development at Wavefront, and CEO of Viewpoint Digital and Bungee Labs. 
 
Plaehn holds a B.A. in Mathematics from the University of California, San Diego. He studied Computer Science at San Diego State University and graduated from UCSD's Executive Business Program for Scientists and Engineers.

References

External links
 Control4

American technology chief executives
Living people
University of California, San Diego alumni
San Diego State University alumni
Year of birth missing (living people)